Self care is the maintenance of one's personal well-being and health.

Self Care may also refer to:

 Self Care (album), 2020 album by Yours Truly
 "Self Care" (song), a song by Mac Miller from his 2018 album Swimming
 "Self Care", a song by Miiesha from her 2020 album Nyaaringu